Frank Buttery (May 13, 1851 – December 16, 1902) was an American professional baseball player who played  during the 1872 season for the Middletown Mansfields in the National Association.

Death
He died at age 51 in 1902 from blood poisoning.

References

External links

1851 births
1902 deaths
Major League Baseball third basemen
Major League Baseball outfielders
Major League Baseball pitchers
19th-century baseball players
Middletown Mansfields players
Baseball players from Connecticut